Crow Sit on Blood Tree is the third solo album by Blur guitarist Graham Coxon, released in 2001. Notably, it is perhaps the darkest and quietest of Coxon's albums, containing mournful ballads ("All Has Gone", "A Place for Grief"), folky tracks ("Too Uptight", "Thank God for the Rain") and Coxon's signature overdriven rock songs ("Burn it Down", "Empty Word").

Track listing
All tracks written by Graham Coxon.

There is a hidden track of a low guitar-humming sound at the end of "A Place for Grief".

References

2001 albums
Graham Coxon albums